Bael may refer to:
Aegle marmelos, commonly known as the Bael tree
Bael (demon)
Bael (wrestler)

See also
 Baal (disambiguation)
 Bail (disambiguation)